Leptobrachella kalonensis is a species of frog in the family Megophryidae. It is endemic to Vietnam.

Taxonomy
Jodi J. L. Rowley and colleagues described this species in 2016. The holotype was deposited at the Institute of Ecology and Biological Resources (IEBR) in Hanoi. Paratypes were deposited at IEBR as well as the American Museum of Natural History.

Etymology
The specific epithet kalonensis refers to species's type locality, which was near a village formerly called Kalon.

Distribution
As of 2021, this species has only been recorded in the Song Luy Watershed Forest, in Bình Thuận Province, Vietnam. It probably has a wider distribution, however.

References

kalonensis
Amphibians of Vietnam
Endemic fauna of Vietnam
Amphibians described in 2016
Taxa named by Jodi Rowley
Taxa named by Thomas Ziegler (zoologist)